The men's pole vault event at the 1999 IAAF World Indoor Championships was held on March 6.

Results

References
Results

Pole
Pole vault at the World Athletics Indoor Championships